Virgil Jordan (1892–1965) was an economist and author. He was a past president of the National Industrial Conference Board and editor with BusinessWeek. He had liberal viewpoints.

Bibliography
 Freedom in America (with Henry Hazlitt), 1945
 Manifesto for the Atomic Age, 1946
 "One Year After", 1946 pamphlet

1892 births
1965 deaths
20th-century American economists